The Cat (French: La chatte) is a 1958 French war drama film directed by Henri Decoin and starring Françoise Arnoul, Bernhard Wicki and André Versini. It was shot at the Billancourt Studios in Paris. The film's sets were designed by the art director Lucien Aguettand. The story is loosely based on that of the Resistance operative Mathilde Carré during the Second World War. A commercial success, it was followed by a sequel The Cat Shows Her Claws in 1960.

Cast

References

Bibliography 
 Dayna Oscherwitz & MaryEllen Higgins. The A to Z of French Cinema. Scarecrow Press, 2009.

External links 
 

1958 war films
French war drama films
1958 films
1950s French-language films
Films directed by Henri Decoin
French World War II films
Films scored by Joseph Kosma
Films about the French Resistance
Films shot at Billancourt Studios
1950s French films